The Sanctuary of Saint Pio of Pietrelcina (sometimes referred to as Padre Pio Pilgrimage Church) is a Catholic shrine in San Giovanni Rotondo, Province of Foggia, Italy, owned by the Order of Friars Minor Capuchin. Its surface area is 6,000 square meters. Built in devotion to Saint Pio of Pietrelcina, it can accommodate 6,500 people seated at worship, with standing room for 30,000 people outside. The Genoan architect Renzo Piano designed the church. It is located in front of Casa Sollievo della Sofferenza (Home for Relief of the Suffering), a large Italian hospital and research center, founded by Padre Pio.

See also 
 Saint Pio of Pietrelcina
 Casa Sollievo della Sofferenza
 Padre Pio TV

References 
 Amelar, S. (2004–11). Against the profane, the commercial, and the mundane, Renzo Piano strives to create a spiritual pilgrimage site at the Church of Padre Pio. In Architectural Record, 195, 184 – 192.
Jonathan Glancey, "In the name of the padre: Renzo Piano, co-creator of the Pompidou Centre, has pulled off another masterpiece", The Guardian, 30 September 2002.

External links 

 Sanctuary of Saint Pio of Pietrelcina – Official Website

Churches in the province of Foggia
20th-century Roman Catholic church buildings in Italy
Renzo Piano buildings
San Giovanni Rotondo